Saudization, officially the Saudi nationalization scheme and also known as Nitaqat, is a policy that is implemented in the Kingdom of Saudi Arabia by the Ministry of Labor and Social Development, which requires companies and enterprises to fill their workforce with Saudi nationals up to certain levels.

Prior to its implementation, the private sector was largely dominated by expatriate workers from India, Pakistan, the Philippines, and Arab countries such as Lebanon and Egypt.

The Saudi Government took the decision to reduce unemployment among native Saudis, under the slogan 'Let's Put the Saudi in Saudization'.  Companies that fail to comply with Saudization regulations have been warned that they "will not be awarded government contracts". While the "Saudi political elite" is agreed on the importance of Saudization, Saudi businesses have complained about its implementation and sought ways to avoid it.

In 2017, updates to the Saudization percentages were announced, differing in the number of Saudi nationals required depending on industry and company size.

History
While many Saudi native men found employment with the government, there were not enough government jobs as over 65% of the population is of working age. 
'Saudization' of the workforce has been a goal of the kingdom since at least the Fourth Development Plan (1985-1989) which called for replacing foreign workers with Saudi natives as one of its objectives. Immigration was tightened and many undocumented foreign workers were deported, but the program was only a marginal success.

A Saudization goal for 2003 was that at least 30% of employees of companies with 20 or more workers should be Saudi natives, (although only 300,000 people were employed by companies of this size).

In June 2006, negotiations between business executives and senior government leaders, including King Abdullah, led to reductions of Saudization targets in some work sectors from 30 percent to 10 percent, and full waivers from Saudization in the case of two Chinese companies, according to discussions between US ambassador James C. Oberwetter and Saudi executives.

In 2014 the Saudi Gazette reported that one of the targets of the kingdom's Ninth Development Plan (2010-2015) -- to "bring down the unemployment rate to 5.5 percent and revive the Saudization strategy"—had not been realized.

Currently, the plan targets Saudi youths as well he women workers for the growth of the kingdom's economy. The Shura council (a consultative body) dictated that as of 2007, 70 percent of the work force were Saudi. Between 2011 and 2013, the transportation and communication sectors recorded the highest improvement in Saudization rates from 9 percent to 20 percent. Manufacturing also underwent a notable improvement in Saudization rates (from 13 percent to 19.3 percent). Academics working on aspects of Saudization include, among many others, Ingo Forstenlechner from United Arab Emirates University, Kasim Randeree from the British University of Dubai, Paul Knoglinger from the FHWien, Marie-France Waxin from the American University of Sharjah.

Saudization rates in the retail and construction sectors also improved from 12.9 percent and 7.2 percent to 18.4 percent and 10.3 percent respectively, said the report.
Taking average growth for the period between 2011 and 2013, improved Saudization rates in the transportation sector came mainly as a result of a significant 59 percent growth in employment of Saudis. Average Saudi employment growth in the manufacturing and wholesale and retail sectors was also high, at 25 percent each. 
Meanwhile, employment growth for non-Saudis averaged just 4 percent and 7 percent respectively.

The construction sector — the most labor-intensive part of the private sector — recorded an impressive 34 percent average growth in employment of Saudis, while employment of non-Saudis in the sector grew by 14 percent. 
The higher growth in Saudi employment in the construction sector is impressive given the particularly high wage differential from non-Saudis. Saudis in the construction sector earned a monthly average of SR3,330 in 2013, while non-Saudis earned only SR1,029.

Challenges
At least some observers (Harvey Tripp and Peter North) have called the Saudization efforts "desultory" and stated that Saudi businesses complain that native Saudis are unwilling to take service and manual labor jobs and unable to take skilled technical jobs for which they are not educated. Most graduates were trained in religious subjects. As of 2009, only about 20 percent of the kingdom's graduates were in technical and scientific fields. One Saudi employer complained to a Western journalist (Max Rodenbeck) "I want to hire Saudis, but why would I hire someone who I know won't show up, won't care, and can't be fired." When legislation reserved employment for Saudis in certain designated industries (taxi driving and selling gold) the laws "were fairly quickly rescinded" when the targeted industries "degenerated, almost immediately, into chaos" after guest workers were replaced by Saudis with "no job knowledge and little inclination to work."
One effect of the program has been to create a black market for visas for foreign workers estimated at $1500 or more (as of 2008), as Saudization enforcers attempt to limit the issue of work visas and private businesses seek to circumvent that limit.
In 2014, Arab News reported that the failure to meet the Saudization target had led to thousands of businesses being shut down, and to others meeting the goals by "cooking the books" by hiring Saudis who do no actual work.

The first phase of Saudization went into effect in September 2018, wherein car dealerships and sellers of clothing, furniture, and household utensils would employ locals in approximately 70% of sales jobs. The reform is expected to create 60,000 jobs for Saudis. However, the demand is for 700,000 positions by 2020. The Saudi private sector is still in a very difficult phase, being dominated mostly by foreigners.

Nitaqat

Description
Nitaqat system is a program of Saudization, increasing the employment of Saudi nationals in the private sector. The program classifies the country's private firms into six categories: Platinum, High Green, Mid Green, Low Green, Yellow, and Red.  Platinum is the highest percentage category followed by High Green and so on, the Yellow and Red categories being the lowest. The classification of other companies is based on the Saudization percentage (% of Saudi employees) and the total number of employees.

Nitaqat requires employers in the private sector with over 9 employees to hire a certain percentage of Saudi nationals, depending on the company’s industry and the number of employees in the company. Companies with less than 10 employees are exempt from the program, but still need to employ at least one Saudi citizen.  Rapid visa services are available only to businesses that are in the platinum category of the Nitaqat system to improve employment for Saudis.

The initiative was announced in June 2011, when the Ministry of Labor passed Ministerial Resolution no. (4040).  The implementation deadline for the program was in 2013.  Nearly 90,000 Indians left Saudi by the end of October 2013.  About 466,689 Indian workers have renewed their iqamas (resident permit) over the last five months of the grace period, 359,997 workers have transferred their sponsorship and 355,035 workers changed their job titles to legalize their status (e.g.: profession change, sponsorship change, etc.) reports the Financial Express.  More than 200,000 private firms were closed down in 2014 for failing to meet the conditions set within the Nitaqat nationalization program aimed at reducing unemployment among Saudis.

The companies receive incentives or penalties depending on the category they belong to: and a full list of percentage breakdown by industry and company size is available.

Saudi Arabia completed the regularization of nearly four million foreign workers in the second quarter of 2013 as part of its `Nitaqat` program, with 1.18 million ex-pats choosing to change their profession.

Misuse of Nitaqat
An official at the Ministry of Labor said inspection teams from the ministry are closely monitoring companies who have been exploiting people with disabilities in order to encourage their Saudization rates. The officials check on employees with disabilities during inspection rounds to identify the nature of the work, their presence at the job, and the type of arrangements and services provided to them, noting that the number of people with disabilities employed at a facility cannot exceed 10 percent. If employees with disabilities in a firm exceed more than 10 percent of the total number of Saudi employees, then each disabled worker is calculated like any other Saudi. “It is unfortunate that there are some companies and individuals who exploit people with disabilities to pump up their Saudization rates,”and Saudi workers with disabilities who are able to work are counted as four employees in the Saudization ratio. They must be paid a minimum monthly wage of 3,000 riyals and should not be counted as part of the Saudization ratio of another establishment. Recent reports reveal that companies have been hiring Saudis with disabilities in order to boost Saudization rates as these disabled employees count as 4 employees, thus saving the company from hiring able-bodied Saudi employees at higher salaries. An executive at a private company said there are some people with disabilities who present themselves to the companies for employment in return for salaries, bonuses, and benefits. Companies are thus paying less to disabled employees who is equal to four Saudis than they would if they hired four Saudis with salaries of more than SR 20,000 each. They offer their services. Some companies accept and refuse, others added. The Ministry of Labor and other agencies work together regarding the issue of employees with disabilities, noting that the Ministry of Labor determines the nature of disability upon interviewing the employee. They currently posted a draft of the disability employment legislation on the “Together We Improve” portal for discussion before making a decision to amend the definition of disability work and conditions for employment stipulated in Article 13. Disabled employees to count as more than one employee in Nitaqat, the individual must hold a license or identification card from the Ministry of Social Affairs or Ministry of Labor indicating the type and degree of disability. Further, work conditions and systems must be acceptable and suitable for employees based on the type of disability, and establishments should ensure all services are in place before the employee begins work.

See also

Foreign workers in Saudi Arabia
Emiratisation
Omanisation
Qatarization
Economic nationalism
Nativism (politics)

References

External links
 "Cabinet Adopts Measures to Boost Saudization Drive", Arab News, 15 February 2005
 "Saudization and Sound Economic Reforms: Are the Two Compatible?", Robert Looney, Center for Contemporary Conflict, February 2004

Economy of Saudi Arabia
Society of Saudi Arabia
Foreign relations of Saudi Arabia
Employment by country